James Buchanan Nies (22 November 1856 - 1922) was an American episcopal minister and Assyriologist. He was president of the American Oriental Society in 1921.

Selected publications

Articles
 "Notes on a Cross Jordan Trip Made October 23rd to November 7th, 1899", Palestine Exploration Quarterly, Vol. 33 (1901), No. 4, pp. 362–368.
 "The Opportunity of the American School of Archaeology in Palestine", Journal of Biblical Literature, Vol. 20, No. 1 (1901), pp. 31–37.
 "The Boomerang in Ancient Babylonia", American Anthropologist, New Series, Vol. 16, No. 1 (January–March 1914), pp. 26–32.
 "A Net Cylinder of Entemena", Journal of the American Oriental Society, Vol. 36 (1916), pp. 137–139.

Books
 Historical, Religious and Economic Texts and Antiquities. Yale University Press, New Haven, 1920. (With Clarence E. Keiser)
 Ur Dynasty Tablets. Texts chiefly from Tello and Drehem written during the reigns of Dungi, Bur-Sin, Gimil-Sin, and Ibi-Sin &c. J.C. Hinrichs, Leipzig, 1920.

References

Further reading
 Keiser, C. E. (1918) Letters and contracts from Erech written in the neo-Babylonian period. Babylonian Inscriptions in the Collection of James B. Nies, Vol. 1. New Haven: Yale University Press.

External links 
https://babylonian-collection.yale.edu/publication-series/babylonian-inscriptions-collection-james-b-nies-bin
https://www.loc.gov/resource/amedsaid1831.dw011/

1856 births
1922 deaths
American Episcopal clergy
People from Newark, New Jersey
American philologists
American Assyriologists
Linguists from the United States